Mansour Hedayati  (: Mansour Hedāyati) (January 24, 1951 – February 9, 2009) was an Iranian poet, author, social critic from Mazandaran Province. He mostly wrote naturalistic, social and critical poems in Persian and Mazandarani Language. Some of his poems have been published in some native journals and magazines.

Hedayati was born in Velila, Savadkuh County, and was the son of the "Hedayat", the village's nobleman. He also was ideologically a Reformist poet who his works deal with idealistic and naturalistic reform of human society.

Early life

Childhood and education 

Mansour Hedayati son of "Hedayat" born on January 24, 2016, in a village called Velila in Savadkuh County, Mazandaran Province of Iran.

Death
Mansour Hedayati died in 2009 of a brain cancer in a hospital in Tehran.

Bibliography
Becha Becha: Mazandarni poetry collection. Sari: Shelfin, 2009.
In the realm of the Sun. Qaem Shahr: Elm-o-Amal, 1999.
The straight path to civil society. Qaem Shahr: Elm-o-Amal, 1999.
Where is the sky?. Qaem Shahr: Elm-o-Amal, 2002.
The Greater World. Qaem Shahr: Elm-o-Amal, 1999.

Unpublished works
 Sound of Hoopoe (Persian poetry collection) 
 As far as a world (in Persian)
 In the edges of the life (in Persian)

See also

Mazandarani Language
Persian literature

Iranian male writers
Persian-language poets
Iranian reformists
People from Savadkuh
Deaths from brain cancer in Iran
1951 births
2009 deaths
Mazandarani people